Love Story in Shanghai, also known as Symphony of Rain, is a 2001 Chinese period television drama series directed by Zhao Baogang, set in 1930s Shanghai.

The show was broadcast on 14 national networks almost simultaneously beginning in late May 2001, and more than 20 local networks during the year. It dominated ratings on Shanghai Television and was the top-rated show on Guangdong Television for the year. In Taiwan, it was broadcast on Taiwan Television in February/March 2001 and received respectable ratings. In Japan, the show was streamed on the website showtime.jp beginning in May 2007.

Cast
Zhou Xun as Du Xinyu
Chen Kun as Chen Zikun
Lu Yi as Li Yingqi
Luo Haiqiong as Fang Ziyi
Li Xiaoran as An Qi
Sun Honglei as Ah Lai
Liu Jui-chi as Wu Chuyu
Kou Hsi-shun as Du Yunhe
Xu Huanhuan as Fan Lijun
Liao Fan as Wu Boping
Yu Luosheng as Li Rongsheng

References

External links

2001 Chinese television series debuts
2001 Chinese television series endings
Television shows set in Shanghai
Television shows filmed in Shanghai
Mandarin-language television shows
Chinese period television series
Chinese romance television series